Hurricane Dennis was an early-forming major hurricane in the Caribbean and Gulf of Mexico during the record-breaking 2005 Atlantic hurricane season. Dennis was the fourth named storm, second hurricane, and first major hurricane of the season. Forming in July, the hurricane became the strongest Atlantic hurricane ever to form before August at the time, a title it held for only six days before being surpassed by Hurricane Emily.

Dennis made landfall in Cuba twice as a Category 4 hurricane on the Saffir–Simpson scale and made landfall on the United States' Florida Panhandle as a Category 3 storm, coming less than a year after the devastating Hurricane Ivan. Dennis killed 88 people in total and was responsible for $3.98 billion (2005 USD) in damages, of which $2.5 billion (2005 USD) occurred in the United States.

Meteorological history 

The tropical wave that became Dennis was identified by the National Hurricane Center on June 26, 2005, well inland over Africa. It later emerged over the Atlantic Ocean on June 29 and moved quickly to the west. Dry conditions over the Sahara initially inhibited development, though the wave found more favorable conditions and intensified into a tropical depression on July 4 while nearing the Windward Islands. The depression soon crossed the island country of Grenada before entering the Caribbean, where increasingly favorable environmental factors, such as low wind shear and high sea surface temperatures, fueled intensification. Turning west-northwest, the system achieved tropical storm status on July 5 and hurricane status the following day. Formation of a well-defined eye and central dense overcast signaled Dennis's intensification into a major hurricane on July 7. The hurricane subsequently traversed the Jamaica Channel, bringing deadly floods to both Jamaica and Haiti.

The powerful storm soon struck Granma Province, Cuba, as a Category 4 hurricane early on July 8; violent winds battered the province and caused extensive damage. Briefly weakening due to interaction with land, Dennis quickly regained its strength. However, it soon weakened to winds of  later that day as a result of an eyewall replacement cycle before making a second landfall in the country, this time in Matanzas Province. Interaction with the mountains of Cuba caused significant weakening; however, once Dennis emerged over the Gulf of Mexico on July 9, it quickly reorganized in favorable conditions. The hurricane reached Category 4 strength for the third time on July 10 as it approached Florida, attaining its lowest barometric pressure of 930 mbar (hPa). This ranked Dennis as the strongest hurricane in the Atlantic basin to form before August; however, this record was broken just six days later by Hurricane Emily, which surpassed Dennis and attained Category 5 status. Weakening ensued as the hurricane approached the Florida Panhandle, the storm ultimately making landfall over Santa Rosa Island on July 10 as a Category 3. Weakening continued as the cyclone moved further inland, and the storm quickly lost tropical cyclone status. Dennis' remnant circulation remained, however, traversing the Mississippi River Valley and Ohio River Valley before finally dissipating over Ontario on July 18.

Preparations

Caribbean
In Haiti, officials evacuated residents along the coastline, but noted that many were not obliging. In Cuba more than 600,000 residents were moved from their homes to government shelters or other locations in anticipation of Dennis. All schools were closed, and most flights in the country were suspended or cancelled.

The Cayman Islands chapter of the Red Cross opened shelters on July 7 and placed 120 volunteers on standby. Schools and government offices closed for the duration of Dennis's passage.

United States
In the United States, the governors of Florida, Alabama, Mississippi and Louisiana all declared states of emergency in their states. At 6 am CDT (2300 UTC) on July 9, 2005, all southbound lanes on Interstate 65 from Mobile to Montgomery, Alabama, were closed. Traffic was redirected, making all four lanes northbound to allow evacuations. In Alabama residents in all parts of Mobile County, and those south of I-10 in Baldwin County, were ordered to evacuate. Similar orders were issued in Mississippi for parts of Jackson, Hancock, and Harrison counties; and for coastal areas in the Florida Panhandle stretching from Escambia County to Bay County. Likewise, military installations such as NAS Pensacola, Whiting Field, Eglin AFB, Hurlburt Field and Tyndall AFB were all evacuated days before the storm. Additionally, Red Cross officials opened 87 shelters across the state which were able to hold about 14,000 evacuees.

In Florida, about 50,000 tourists in the Keys were forced to evacuate by July 8. The MacDill Air Force Base in Tampa evacuated its aircraft to McConnell Air Force Base near Wichita, Kansas. 700,000 people in the Florida panhandle were evacuated in the days prior to Dennis, 100,000 of them in Escambia County alone. As a result of the large evacuations, more than 200 truckloads provided about 1.8 million gallons of gasoline. The Red Cross also moved 60 mobile canteens capable of serving 30,000 hot meals each a day to the staging points of Hattiesburg and Jackson. National guardsmen were mobilized, and four emergency medical teams, each capable of setting up a small field hospital, were on standby. Also, at Eglin Air Force Base, about 20,000 military personnel were evacuated, and at Hurlburt Field, home to Air Force's 16th Special Operations Wing, a mandatory evacuation was ordered for all 15,000 airmen and their families.

Impact

Caribbean 

Heavy rain from the outer bands of Dennis produced widespread flooding and landslides in Haiti. The resulting torrents killed at least 56 people, injured 36 others, and left 24 more missing. At least nine of the fatalities occurred when a bridge collapsed in Grand-Goâve. Extensive property damage was incurred with 929 homes destroyed and another 3,058 damaged, leaving 1,500 families homeless. Damage totaled US$50 million.

Widespread flash flooding ensued, damaging or destroying numerous homes and businesses. The overflow of multiple rivers prompted evacuations in several towns and left many stranded. Saint Thomas and Portland Parishes were hardest-hit. Overall, one person died there and damage exceeded J$2.128 billion (US$34.5 million).

From there the storm moved to Cuba, leaving 16 people dead and $1.4 billion in damages as it roared through the island, flattening houses and downing trees and power lines. According to reports from the Cuban government, 120,000 homes were damaged, 15,000 of which were destroyed. The citrus and vegetable industries were also devastated as Cuba's primary agricultural regions were the hardest hit. Nonetheless, Fidel Castro publicly refused US aid after the storm in protest of the ongoing US trade embargo against Cuba, stating that, "If they offered $1 billion we would say no." Dennis was more destructive than the previous year's Hurricane Charley and was widely regarded as the worst hurricane to strike Cuba since Hurricane Flora in the 1963 season.

United States 

In the United States, damage was not as high as originally expected, mainly because Dennis was more compact and moved more quickly than initially forecast. Dennis moved about  faster than Ivan at landfall, and had hurricane-force winds that only extended  from its center, compared to Ivan's 105-mile radius (170 km).

In southern Florida, damage was mostly limited to moderate wind gusts; in Miami-Dade County, gusty winds knocked out several traffic lights along U.S. 1, the only route to and from the Florida Keys. A man died in Fort Lauderdale when he stepped on a downed electrical wire and was electrocuted. Damage was mostly minor and limited to outer rainbands and tornadoes in Central Florida. In the Tampa Bay area, several tornadoes were reported to have touched down causing minor damage such as downed trees and power lines. The most severe damage occurred on the Florida Panhandle. Milton received  of rain, the highest reported rainfall total in Florida caused by Dennis. No significant damage was reported to most structures; however, insurers initially estimated that Dennis caused $3–$5 billion in insured damage, or approximately $6–$10 billion total (insured damage estimates are generally held to be approximately one-half of total damages). However, the NHC reported total damage in the United States as only $2.5 billion with $1.115 billion of insured damage.

In Alabama, sustained winds reached minimal hurricane force in the interior of the state. In total, 280,000 people in Alabama experienced power outages during the storm. No deaths occurred, although Dennis caused three injuries and total damage amounted to $127 million (2005 USD), mostly due to structural damage. There was also severe damage to cotton crops. In Mississippi, damage was not as severe as previously anticipated. As Dennis impacted the state, a storm tide of – above normal was reported. Wind gusts peaked at  causing several hundred trees to uproot or snap, damaging a total of 21 homes and businesses.

Dennis caused at least 10 tornadoes in the U.S., although only one of them reached F1 status on the Fujita scale. Parts of Georgia, which had received heavy rain just days earlier from Hurricane Cindy, suffered heavy flooding, and flash-floods were reported on the outskirts of the Atlanta metropolitan area.

In the United States, 15 storm-related deaths (14 in Florida) were reported, including one in Walton County, three in Broward County, three in Charlotte County, one each in Nassau and Escambia Counties and one in Decatur, Georgia.

Aftermath 

Because of the great amount of damage and deaths in the Caribbean and United States, the name Dennis was retired in the spring of 2006, and will never again be used for an Atlantic hurricane. It was replaced by Don, which was first used during the 2011 hurricane season. Dennis was one of five names to be retired in 2005—alongside Katrina, Rita, Stan, and Wilma; this is the greatest such number since the implementation of retirement in 1955.

See also 

 Tropical cyclones in 2005
 List of Florida hurricanes (2000–present)
 List of retired Atlantic hurricane names
 List of wettest tropical cyclones in Cuba
 List of wettest tropical cyclones in the United States
 List of Category 4 Atlantic hurricanes
 Hurricane Opal (1995) – A powerful Category 4 hurricane that affected the similar areas as a Category 3 storm
 Hurricane Georges (1998) – Another Category 4 hurricane that produced similar effects in the Gulf Coast Region as a Category 2 storm
 Hurricane Ivan (2004) – A Category 5 hurricane that struck the Gulf Coast less than a year earlier as a Category 3 storm, causing devastating damage
 Hurricane Gustav (2008) – A Category 4 hurricane that took a similar track before striking southern Louisiana as a Category 2 storm
 Hurricane Michael (2018) – A Category 5 hurricane that became the strongest tropical cyclone ever to strike the Florida Panhandle
 Hurricane Sally (2020) – A slow-moving Category 2 hurricane that caused widespread damage in the Florida Panhandle
Hurricane Elsa (2021) - A Category 1 hurricane that had a similar path, and affected similar areas.

References

External links 

  – A final report issued by the National Hurricane Center regarding Hurricane Dennis, including synoptic history, meteorological statistics, casualties and damage, forecasting critique, and information tables.
 The National Hurricane Center's archive on Hurricane Dennis
 Radar animation of landfall in Florida (credit to Brian McNoldy, RSMAS/Univ of Miami) 
 The Hydrometeorological Prediction Center's archive on Hurricane Dennis.
 The Hydrometeorological Prediction Center's Rainfall page for Hurricane Dennis.
 Historic Images of Florida Hurricanes (State Archives of Florida)

 
Retired Atlantic hurricanes
2005 Atlantic hurricane season
Category 4 Atlantic hurricanes
Hurricanes in Cuba
Hurricanes in Florida
Hurricane Dennis
Hurricanes in Tennessee
Tropical cyclones in 2005